The All-India Muslim League (AIML) was a political party established in Dhaka in 1906 when some well-known Muslim politicians met the Viceroy of British India, Lord Minto, with the goal of securing Muslim interests on the Indian subcontinent.

The party arose out of the need for the political representation of Muslims in British India, especially during the Indian National Congress-sponsored massive Hindu opposition to the 1905 partition of Bengal. During the 1906 annual meeting of the All India Muslim Education Conference held in Israt Manzil Palace, Dhaka, the Nawab of Dhaka, Khwaja Salimullah, forwarded a proposal to create a political party which would protect the interests of Muslims in British India. Sir Mian Muhammad Shafi, a prominent Muslim leader from Lahore, suggested the political party be named the 'All-India Muslim League'. The motion was unanimously passed by the conference, leading to the official formation of the All-India Muslim League in Dhaka. It remained an elitist organization until 1937, when the leadership began mobilising the Muslim masses, which turned the league into a popular organization.

In the 1930s, the idea of a separate nation-state and influential philosopher Sir Muhammad Iqbal's vision of uniting the four provinces in North-West British India further supported the rationale of the two-nation theory. This aligned with the ideas proposed by Syed Ahmad Khan who, in 1888 at Meerut, said, "After this long preface I wish to explain what method my nation — nay, rather the whole people of this country — ought to pursue in political matters. I will treat in regular sequence of the political questions of India, in order that you may have full opportunity of giving your attention to them. The first of all is this — In whose hands shall the administration and the Empire of India rest? Now, suppose that all English, and the whole English army, were to leave India, taking with them all their cannon and their splendid weapons and everything, then who would be rulers of India? Is it possible that under these circumstances two nations — the Mahomedans and the Hindus — could sit on the same throne and remain equal in power? Most certainly not. It is necessary that one of them should conquer the other and thrust it down. To hope that both could remain equal is to desire the impossible and the inconceivable." When the Congress party effectively protested against the United Kingdom unilaterally involving India in World War II without consulting the Indian people, the Muslim League went on to support the British war efforts. The Muslim League played a decisive role in the 1940s, becoming a driving force behind the division of India along religious lines and the creation of Pakistan as a Muslim state in 1947.

After the Partition of India and the establishment of Pakistan, the All-India Muslim League was formally disbanded in India. The League was officially succeeded by the Pakistan Muslim League, which eventually split into several political parties. Other groups diminished to a minor party, that too only in Kerala state of India. In Bangladesh, the Muslim League was revived in 1976, but it was reduced in size, rendering it insignificant in the political arena. In India, a separate independent entity called the Indian Union Muslim League was formed, which continues to have a presence in the Indian parliament to this day.

History

Foundation

With the sincere efforts by the pioneers of the Congress to attract Muslims to their sessions the majority of the Islamic leadership, with exception of few scholars like Sir Syed Ahmed Khan and Syed Ameer Ali, who focused more on Islamic education and scientific developments, rejected the notion that India's has two distinct communities to be represented separately Congress sessions.

In 1886, Sir Syed founded the Muhammadan Educational Conference, but a self-imposed ban prevented it from discussing politics. Its original goal was to advocate for British education, especially science and literature, among India's Muslims. The conference, in addition to generating funds for Sir Syed's Aligarh Muslim University, motivated the Muslim upper class to propose an expansion of educational uplift elsewhere, known as the Aligarh Movement. In turn, this new awareness of Muslim needs helped stimulate a political consciousness among Muslim elites, For a few of them, many years after the death of Sir Syed Ahmad Khan the All-India Muslim League was formed in Dhaka, Bangladesh.

The formation of a Muslim political party on the national level was seen as essential by 1901. The first stage of its formation was the meeting held at Lucknow in September 1906, with the participation of representatives from all over India. The decision for the re-consideration to form the all-Indian Muslim political party was taken and further proceedings were adjourned until the next meeting of the All India Muhammadan Educational Conference. The Simla Deputation reconsidered the issue in October 1906 and decided to frame the objectives of the party on the occasion of the annual meeting of the Educational Conference, which was scheduled to be held in Dhaka. Meanwhile, Nawab Salimullah Khan published a detailed scheme through which he suggested the party to be named All-India Muslim Confederacy.

Pursuant to the decisions taken earlier at the Lucknow meeting and later in Simla, the annual meeting of the All-India Muhammadan Educational Conference was held in Dhaka from 27 December until 30 December 1906. Three thousand delegates attended, headed by both Nawab Waqar-ul-Mulk Kamboh and Nawab Mohsin-ul-Mulk (the Secretary of the Muhammaden Educational Conference), in which they explained its objectives and stressed the unity of Muslims under the banner of an association. It was formally proposed by Nawab Salimullah Khan and supported by Hakim Ajmal Khan, Maulana Muhammad Ali Jauhar, Zafar Ali Khan, Syed Nabiullah, a barrister from Lucknow, and Syed Zahur Ahmad, an eminent lawyer, as well as several others.

Separate electorates
The Muslim League's insistence on separate electorates and reserved seats in the Imperial Council were granted in the Indian Councils Act after the League held protests in India and lobbied London.

The draft proposals for the reforms communicated on 1 October 1908 provided Muslims with reserved seats in all councils, with nominations only being maintained in Punjab. The communication displayed how much the Government had accommodated Muslim demands and showed an increase in Muslim representation in the Imperial and provincial legislatures. But the Muslim League's demands were only fully met in UP and Madras. However, the Government did accept the idea of separate electorates. The idea had not been accepted by the Secretary of State, who proposed mixed electoral colleges, causing the Muslim League to agitate and the Muslim press to protest what they perceived to be a betrayal of the Viceroy's assurance to the Simla deputation.

On 23 February Morley told the House of Lords that Muslims demanded separate representation and accepted them. This was the League's first victory. But the Indian Councils Bill did not fully satisfy the demands of the Muslim League. It was based on the October 1908 communique in which Muslims were only given a few reserved seats. The Muslim League's London branch opposed the bill and in a debate obtained the support of several parliamentarians. In 1909 the members of the Muslim League organised a Muslim protest. The Reforms Committee of Minto's council believed that Muslims had a point and advised Minto to discuss with some Muslim leaders. The Government offered a few more seats to Muslims in compromise but would not agree to fully satisfy the League's demand.

Minto believed that the Muslims had been given enough while Morley was still not certain because of the pressure Muslims could apply on the government. The Muslim League's central committee once again demanded separate electorates and more representation on 12 September 1909. While Minto was opposed, Morley feared that the Bill would not pass parliament without the League's support and he once again discussed Muslim representation with the League leadership. This was successful. The Aga Khan compromised so that Muslims would have two more reserved seats in the Imperial Council. The Muslim League hesitantly accepted the compromise.

Early years
Sultan Muhammad Shah (Aga Khan III) was appointed the first honorary president of the Muslim League, though he did not attend the Dhaka inaugural session. There were also six vice-presidents, a secretary, and two joint secretaries initially appointed for a three-year term, proportionately from different provinces. The League's constitution was framed in 1907, espoused in the "Green Book," written by Mohammad Ali Jauhar.

Aga Khan III shared Ahmad Khan's belief that Muslims should first build up their social capital through advanced education before engaging in politics, but would later boldly tell the British Raj that Muslims must be considered a separate nation within India. Even after he resigned as president of the AIML in 1912, he still exerted a major influence on its policies and agendas. In 1913, Mohammed Ali Jinnah joined the Muslim league.

Intellectual support and a cadre of young activists emerged from Aligarh Muslim University. Historian Mushirul Hasan writes that in the early 20th century, this Muslim institution, designed to prepare students for service to the British Raj, exploded into political activity. Until 1939, the faculty and students supported an all-India nationalist movement. After 1939, however, sentiment shifted dramatically toward a Muslim separatist movement, as students and faculty mobilised behind Jinnah and the Muslim League.

Communalism grows
Politically, there was a degree of unity between Muslim and Hindu leaders after World War I, as typified by the Khilafat Movement. Relationships cooled sharply after that campaign ended in 1922. Communalism grew rapidly, forcing the two groups apart. Major riots broke out in numerous cities, including 91 between 1923 and 1927 in Uttar Pradesh alone. At the leadership level, the proportion of Muslims among delegates to the Congress party fell sharply, from 11% in 1921 to under 4% in 1923.

Muhammad Ali Jinnah became disillusioned with politics after the failure of his attempt to form a Hindu-Muslim alliance, and he spent most of the 1920s in Britain. The leadership of the League was taken over by Sir Muhammad Iqbal, who in 1930 first put forward the demand for a separate Muslim state in India. The "Two-Nation Theory", the belief that Hindus and Muslims were two different nations who could not live in one country, gained popularity among Muslims. The two-state solution was rejected by the Congress leaders, who favoured a united India based on composite national identity. Congress at all times rejected "communalism" — that is, basing politics on religious identity. Iqbal's policy of uniting the North-West Frontier Province, Baluchistan, Punjab, and Sindh into a new Muslim majority state became part of the League's political platform.

The League rejected the Committee report (the Nehru Report), arguing that it gave too little representation (only one quarter) to Muslims, established Devanagari as the official writing system of the colony, and demanded that India turn into a de facto unitary state, with residuary powers resting at the centre – the League had demanded at least one-third representation in the legislature and sizeable autonomy for the Muslim provinces. Jinnah reported a "parting of the ways" after his requests for minor amendments to the proposal were denied outright, and relations between the Congress and the League began to sour.

Conception of Pakistan

On 29 December 1930, Sir Muhammad Iqbal delivered his presidential address to the All-India Muslim League annual session. He said:

Sir Muhammad Iqbal did not use the word "Pakistan" in his address. Some scholars argued that
"Iqbal never pleaded for any kind of partition of the country. Rather he was an ardent proponent of a 'true' federal setup for India..., and wanted a consolidated Muslim majority within the Indian Federation".

Another Indian historian, Tara Chand, also held that Iqbal was not thinking in terms of partition of India, but in terms of a federation of autonomous states within India. Dr. Safdar Mehmood also asserted in a series of articles that in the Allahabad address, Iqbal proposed a Muslim majority province within an Indian federation and not an independent state outside an Indian Federation.

On 28 January 1933, Choudhary Rahmat Ali, founder of the Pakistan National Movement, voiced his ideas in the pamphlet entitled "Now or Never". In a subsequent book, he discussed the etymology in further detail: “'Pakistan' is both a Persian and an Urdu word. It is composed of letters taken from the names of all our homelands ... That is, Panjab, Afghania (North-West Frontier Province), Kashmir, Iran, Sindh (including Kachch and Kathiawar), Tukharistan, Afghanistan, and Balochistan."

The British and the Indian Press vehemently criticised these two different schemes and created confusion about the authorship of the word "Pakistan" to such an extent that even Jawaharlal Nehru had to write:

Campaign for Pakistan

Until 1937, the Muslim League had remained an organisation of elite Indian Muslims. The Muslim League leadership then began mass mobilisation and it then became a popular party with the Muslim masses in the 1940s, especially after the Lahore Resolution. Under Jinnah's leadership, its membership grew to over two million and became more religious and even separatist in its outlook.

The Muslim League's earliest base was the United Provinces, where they successfully mobilised the religious community in the late 1930s. Jinnah worked closely with local politicians, however, there was a lack of uniform political voice by the League during the 1938–1939 Madhe Sahaba riots in Lucknow. From 1937 onwards, the Muslim League and Jinnah attracted large crowds throughout India in its processions and strikes.

At a League conference in Lahore in 1940, Jinnah said:

In Lahore, the Muslim League formally recommitted itself to creating an independent Muslim state which would include Sindh, Punjab, Baluchistan, the North West Frontier Province, and Bengal, and which would be "wholly autonomous and sovereign". The Lahore Resolution, moved by the sitting Chief Minister of Bengal A. K. Fazlul Huq, was adopted on 23 March 1940, and its principles formed the foundation for Pakistan's first constitution. In the Indian provincial elections of 1946, the Muslim League won 425 out of 476 seats reserved for Muslims (and about 89.2% of Muslim votes) on a policy of creating the independent state of Pakistan, and with an implied threat of secession if this was not granted. Congress, led by Gandhi and Nehru, remained adamantly opposed to dividing India.

In opposition to the Lahore Resolution, the All India Azad Muslim Conference gathered in Delhi in April 1940 to voice its support for a united India. Its members included several Islamic organisations in India, as well as 1400 nationalist Muslim delegates; the "attendance at the Nationalist meeting was about five times than the attendance at the League meeting." The All-India Muslim League worked to try to silence those Muslims who stood against the partition of India, often using "intimidation and coercion". For example, Deobandi scholar Maulana Syed Husain Ahmad Madani traveled across British India, spreading the idea he wrote about in his book, Composite Nationalism and Islam, which stood for Hindu-Muslim unity and opposed the concept of a partition of India; while he was doing this, members of the pro-separatist Muslim League attacked Madani and disturbed his rallies. The murder of the All India Azad Muslim Conference leader Allah Bakhsh Soomro in 1943 further solidified the All-India Muslim League to demand the creation of Pakistan.

Role in communal violence

From the late 1930's and onwards in the British Indian province of Sind, communal tensions between Muslims and Hindus rose to enormous degree. These communal feelings were instrumental in the popularity of the All India Muslim League throughout the province.  Even though the Muslims made up about 70% of the population of Sindh, they had a bare majority (34 of 60 seats) in the Assembly. Furthermore, before the British took over, the Sindhi Hindus didn't own any land but within a century of British rule, their landownership grew by 40% while a further 20% was believed to have been mortgaged to them. The inter-faith conflict was at large connected to the peculiar socio economic order in which the Hindus in Sind dominated with their high socioeconomic status, while the Muslims remained marginalized.

The historian Ayesha Jalal describes the actions that the pro-separatist Muslim League used in order to further spread communal division and undermine the elected government of Allah Bakhsh Soomro, which stood for a united India:

In the few years before the partition, the Muslim League was accused of "monetarily subsidizing" mobs that engaged in communal violence against Hindus and Sikhs in the areas of Multan, Rawalpindi, Campbellpur, Jhelum and Sargodha, as well as in the Hazara District. The Muslim League led mobs reportedly paid assassins money for every Hindu and Sikh killed. As such, leaders of the Muslim League, including Muhammad Ali Jinnah, issued no condemnation of the violence against Hindus and Sikhs in Punjab.

Impact on the future courses of the Subcontinent

Pakistan

After the partition of the British Indian Empire, the Muslim League played a major role in giving birth to modern conservatism in Pakistan and the introduction of the democratic process in the country.

The Pakistani incarnation was originally led by the founder of Pakistan, Muhammad Ali Jinnah, and later by Prime Minister Liaquat Ali Khan, but suffered from ill-fate following the military intervention in 1958. One of its factions remained supportive of President Ayub Khan until 1962, when all factions decided to reform into the Pakistan Muslim League led by Nurul Amin, and to support Fatima Jinnah in the presidential elections in 1965. Furthermore, it was the only party to have received votes from both East and West Pakistan during the elections held in 1970. During the successive periods of Pakistan, the Pakistan Muslim League went on to be one of the ruling parties holding alternating power within the nation.

India

After the partition of India in 1947, the All-India Muslim League was disbanded. It was succeeded by Indian Union Muslim League in the new India.

Indian Union Muslim League contests Indian General Elections under the Indian Constitution. The party has always had a constant, if small presence, in the Indian Parliament. The party has had two members in every Lower House from the third to the 16th House, with the exception of the Second, in which it had no members, and the fourth, in which it had three members. The party had a single member in the 14th Lower House. The party currently has four members in Parliament. The party is currently a part of the United Progressive Alliance in national level.

Indian Union Muslim League is recognized by the Election Commission of India as a State Party in Kerala.The party is a major member of the opposition United Democratic Front, the Indian National Congress-lead pre-poll state-level alliance in Kerala. Whenever the United Democratic Front rules in Kerala, the party leaders are chosen as important Cabinet Ministers.

Bangladesh

The Muslim League formed its government in East Bengal immediately after the partition of Bengal, with Khawaja Nazimuddin becoming the first Chief Minister.

Problems in East Pakistan for the Muslim League began to rise following the issue of the Constitution of Pakistan. Furthermore, the Bengali Language Movement proved to be the last event that led the Muslim League to lose its mandate in East Bengal. The Muslim League's national conservatism program also faced several setbacks and resistance from the Communist Party of Pakistan. In an interview given to print media, Nurul Amin stated that the communists had played an integral and major role in staging the massive protests, mass demonstrations, and strikes for the Bengali Language Movement.

All over the country, the political parties had favoured the general elections in Pakistan with the exception of the Muslim League. In 1954, legislative elections were to be held for the Parliament. Unlike in West Punjab, not all of the Hindu population migrated to India, instead a large number stayed in the state. The influence of the Communist Party deepened, and its goal of attaining power was finally realised during the elections. The United Front, the Communist Party, and the Awami League returned to power, inflicting a severe defeat to the Muslim League. Out of 309, the Muslim League only won 10 seats, whereas the Communist Party got 4 seats of the ten contested. The communists working with other parties had secured 22 additional seats, totalling 26. The right-wing Jamaat-e-Islami had completely failed in the elections.

In 1955, the United Front named Abu Hussain Sarkar as the Chief Minister of the State and he ruled the state in two non-consecutive terms until 1958, when martial law was imposed. The Muslim League remained as a minor party in East Pakistan but participated with full rigour during the Pakistan general elections in 1970. It won 10 seats from East Pakistan and 7 seats from other parts of Pakistan. After the independence of Bangladesh, the Muslim League was revived in 1976 but its size was reduced, rendering it insignificant in the political arena.

United Kingdom

During the 1940s, the Muslim League had a United Kingdom chapter active in the British politics. After the establishment of Pakistan, the Pakistani community's leaders took over the UK branch, choosing Zubeida Habib Rahimtoola as president of the party to continue to serve its purpose in the United Kingdom. At present, the Muslim League's UK branch is led by the PML-N, with Zubair Gull as its president.

Historical versions
Historically, Pakistan Muslim League can also refer to any of the following political parties in Pakistan:
 Muslim League, the original successor of the All-India Muslim League, which was disbanded during the first martial law.
 Convention Muslim League, a political platform created by General Ayub Khan in 1962 when he became the president.
 Council Muslim League, a party created by political leaders who opposed General Ayub Khan.
 Muslim League, a party created by Khan Abdul Qayyum Khan when he split with the Council Muslim League to run for the 1970 general elections.

See also
 Indian Independence Movement
 Muslim nationalism in South Asia
 Indian Nationalism
 List of presidents of the All-India Muslim League

References

Further reading

External links

 Government of Pakistan website
 Pakistan News website
 The Constitution of the Islamic Republic of Pakistan
 Chronicles Of Pakistan
 Jinnah at a Meeting of the Muslim League 16-second QuickTime film clip
 Colloquium on the One Hundred Years of Muslim League at the University of Chicago, 4 Nov 2006

Political parties established in 1906
Muslim league
Islamic political parties in India
Muslim League
1906 establishments in India
1947 disestablishments in India
History of Pakistan
Conservative parties in India
1900s in Islam
Aligarh Movement